Lambari is a municipality in the state of Minas Gerais in the Southeast region of Brazil.

The municipality contains the  Nova Baden State Park, created in 1994.

Notable people 
 Neilor, footballer

See also
List of municipalities in Minas Gerais

References

Municipalities in Minas Gerais